Jean-Claude Patrice Jacques Bernard Olry (born 28 December 1949 in Boves, Somme) is a French retired slalom canoeist who competed in the late 1960s and early 1970s. He won a bronze in the C-2 event at the 1972 Summer Olympics in Munich.

Olry also won two medals at the 1969 ICF Canoe Slalom World Championships in Bourg St.-Maurice with a gold in the C-2 event and a bronze in the C-2 team event.

He won all his medals while partnering his brother Jean-Louis.

References

1949 births
Canoeists at the 1972 Summer Olympics
French male canoeists
Living people
Olympic canoeists of France
Olympic bronze medalists for France
Olympic medalists in canoeing
Medalists at the 1972 Summer Olympics
Medalists at the ICF Canoe Slalom World Championships